Rob Foster (25 March 1947 – 12 March 2014) was an Australian rules footballer who played with Melbourne in the Victorian Football League (VFL).

Notes

External links 		

		
		
		
1947 births
2014 deaths
Australian rules footballers from Victoria (Australia)		
Melbourne Football Club players